Olympique de Marseille won Division 1 season 1971/1972 of the French Association Football League with 56 points.

Teams

 AC Ajaccio
 Angers SCO
 AS Angoulême
 SEC Bastia
 Bordeaux
 Lille OSC
 Olympique Lyonnais
 Olympique de Marseille
 FC Metz
 AS Monaco
 AS Nancy
 FC Nantes
 OGC Nice
 Nîmes Olympique
 Paris Saint-Germain Football Club
 Red Star Paris
 Stade de Reims
 Stade Rennais FC
 AS Saint-Etienne
 FC Sochaux-Montbéliard

League table

Promoted from Division 2, who will play in Division 1 season 1972/1973
 US Valenciennes-Anzin: Champion of Division 2, winner of Division 2 group B
 CS Sedan: Runner-up, winner of Division 2 group A
 RC Strasbourg: Runner-up, winner of Division 2 group C

Results

Top goalscorers

References

 Division 1 season 1971-1972 at pari-et-gagne.com

Ligue 1 seasons
French
1